In June 2013, Wales toured Japan as part of the 2013 mid-year rugby test series. They faced Japan in a two-test series on 8 and 15 June, playing in the oldest dedicated rugby union stadium in Japan, Kintetsu Hanazono Rugby Stadium in Osaka, and the home stadium of Japanese rugby, Chichibunomiya Rugby Stadium in Tokyo. The test series was Wales' first test series against Japan since 2001, when Wales were victorious 2–0, and their first encounter since Wales' 72–18 victory in the 2007 Rugby World Cup Pool B match. Wales were also the first Tier 1 nation to play Japan in Japan since Italy in 2006.

At the start of the tour Japan were yet to earn a victory over the Welsh, with Wales winning all fixtures before this test series. However, the second match of the series saw Japan win their first test match against Wales. The test series ended in a 1–1 draw with Wales winning the first test and Japan winning the second.

Fixtures

Squads

Wales
In the absence of Warren Gatland and Rob Howley with their commitments on the 2013 British & Irish Lions tour to Australia, Robin McBryde took on the role of head coach. On 21 May, McBryde named a 27-man squad for the tour.

Aaron Shingler and Ashley Beck were ruled out with injury ahead of the tour (28 May) and was replaced with Josh Navidi and Adam Warren
15 players were also unavailable due to selection for the Lions tour to Australia.

Head coach: Robin McBryde (interim)

Japan
The Japanese 36-man squad for 2013 IRB Pacific Nations Cup and Wales' tour of Japan.

Head coach:  Eddie Jones
 Caps and ages are to first Test (8 June 2013)

Matches

First test

Note:
Dan Baker, Dafydd Howells, James King, Rhys Patchell, Emyr Phillips, Andries Pretorius, Owen Williams (all Wales) and Yusuke Nagae (Japan) made their international debuts.

Second test

Note:
 This was Japan's first victory over Wales.

See also
 2013 mid-year rugby test series
 History of rugby union matches between Japan and Wales

References

Rugby union tours of Japan
Wales national rugby union team tours
Wales
Wales
Japan
Wales